Manikarnika may refer to:

Manikarnika Ghat, a cremation grounds along the river Ganga in Varanasi, Uttar Pradesh, India
Manikarnika Tambe, Indian queen of the Maratha princely state of Jhansi 
Manikarnika: The Queen of Jhansi, a 2019 Indian Hindi-language period drama film based on her life
Manikarnika Express, former name of an Indian daily express train
Manikarnika Tank, a ceremonial water reservoir in Odisha, India